Isaac Brock (1769–1812) was a British army officer.

Isaac Brock may also refer to:

Isaac Brock (musician) (born 1975), American musician
Isaac Brock (longevity claimant) (1787–1909), American longevity claimant